The Police Reservists Act 1902 (2 Edw 7 c. 10) was an Act of Parliament of the Parliament of the United Kingdom, given the royal assent on 22 July 1902 and repealed shortly thereafter.

It provided that if a police constable was called out for permanent service in the Army Reserve as a result of the proclamation of 7 October 1899 (embodying the reserves for the South African War), the police authority was empowered to count any time served in the Reserve as time spent in police service for the purpose of pensions awarded under the Police Act 1890 or the Police (Scotland) Act 1890.

The Act was repealed by the Police (Superannuation) Act 1906 in so far as it applied to England and Wales, and by the Police (Scotland) Act (1890) Amendment Act 1910 for the residue applying to Scotland.

References
The Public General Acts Passed in the Second Year of the Reign of His Majesty King Edward the Seventh. London: printed for His Majesty's Stationery Office. 1902.
Chronological table of the statutes; HMSO, London. 1993.

United Kingdom Acts of Parliament 1902
Police legislation in the United Kingdom